Alexander Konovalov may refer to:

Aleksandr Konovalov (politician, born 1875) (1875–1948), Russian Kadet politician and entrepreneur
Aleksandr Konovalov (politician, born 1968) (born 1968), Russian lawyer and politician
Alexander N. Konovalov, Russian neuroscientist